Robert Lackey (April 9, 1949 – June 4, 2002) was an American professional basketball player. He was born in Evanston, Illinois. Robert Lackey was born to Raymond Oliver Lackey and died from cancer in 2002.

In high school at Evanston Township High School he led the team to the state championship in the 1967-1968 season with a 30-1 overall record.

Lackey played two seasons for the New York Nets of the American Basketball Association. Previously, he had been drafted in the fifth round of the 1972 NBA draft by the Atlanta Hawks. He played at the collegiate level for Casper College and with the then-Marquette Warriors, who have retired his uniform number.

References

1949 births
2002 deaths
African-American basketball players
American expatriate basketball people in France
ASVEL Basket players
Atlanta Hawks draft picks
Basketball players from Illinois
Deaths from cancer in Illinois
Evanston Township High School alumni
Marquette Golden Eagles men's basketball players
New York Nets players
Sportspeople from Evanston, Illinois
American men's basketball players
20th-century African-American sportspeople
21st-century African-American people